Valea Seacă may refer to several places in Romania:

Populated places:
 Valea Seacă, Bacău, a commune
 Valea Seacă, Iași, a commune
 Valea Seacă, a village in Nicolae Bălcescu Commune, Bacău County
 Valea Seacă, a village in Sânzieni Commune, Covasna County
 Valea Seacă, a village in Râciu Commune, Mureș County
 Valea Seacă, a village in Bălțătești Commune, Neamț County
 Valea Seacă, a village in Gornet-Cricov Commune, Prahova County
 Valea Seacă, a village in Tarna Mare Commune, Satu Mare County
 Valea Seacă, a village in Tătărăni Commune, Vaslui County
 Valea Seacă, a district in the town of Lehliu Gară, Călărași County
 Valea Seacă, the name until 1968 of Ștefan cel Mare Commune, Bacău County
 Valea Seacă, until 1967 a village in Valu lui Traian Commune, Constanța County

Rivers:
 Valea Seacă, tributary of the Casimcea in Constanța County
 Valea Seacă, tributary of the Cașin in Covasna County
 Valea Seacă, tributary of the Corozel in Galați County
 Valea Seacă, tributary of the Dâmbovița in Argeș County
 Valea Seacă, tributary of the Danube–Black Sea Canal in Constanța County
 Valea Seacă, tributary of the Doftana in Prahova County
 Valea Seacă, tributary of the Lotru in Vâlcea County
 Valea Seacă, tributary of the Olt near Rotbav, Brașov County
 Valea Seacă, tributary of the Prahova near Azuga, Prahova County
 Valea Seacă, tributary of the Prahova near Bușteni, Prahova County
 Valea Seacă, tributary of the Secaș in Alba County
 Valea Seacă, tributary of the Suseni in Gorj County
 Valea Seacă, tributary of the Tărâia in Gorj County
 Valea Seacă (Topolița), tributary of the Topolița in Neamț County
 Valea Seacă, tributary of the Valea Cerbului in Prahova County
 Valea Seacă, tributary of the Valea de Pești in Hunedoara and Gorj Counties
 Valea Seacă, tributary of the Vărbilău in Prahova County
 Valea Seacă a Baiului, a tributary of the Valea Cerbului in Prahova County
 Valea Seacă a Jepilor, a tributary of the Prahova in Prahova County
 Valea Secărei, a tributary of the Vărbilău in Prahova County
 Valea Seciului, a tributary of the Prahova in Prahova County

See also
Valea (disambiguation)